Figure skating competitions at the 2007 European Youth Olympic Winter Festival took place at the Jaca Arena in Jaca, Spain between February 19 and 22, 2007. Skaters competed in the disciplines of men's singles and ladies' singles.

Results

Men

Ladies

External links
 
 Results at the Official Homepage :
 Timetable of the competition
 Men's short program
 Men's overall results
 Ladies' short program
 Ladies' overall results

2007 European Youth Olympic Winter Festival
European Youth Olympic Festival
Figure skating
International figure skating competitions hosted by Spain